Albert Michael Kruschel (October 21, 1889 – March 25, 1959) was an American road racing cyclist who competed in the 1912 Summer Olympics.

He was part of the team, which won the bronze medal in the Team road race. In the individual road race he finished in 13th place.

References

External links

1889 births
1959 deaths
American male cyclists
Cyclists at the 1912 Summer Olympics
Olympic bronze medalists for the United States in cycling
Medalists at the 1912 Summer Olympics